Michael David Kilkenny (April 11, 1945 – June 28, 2018) was a Canadian professional baseball player who played as a pitcher in Major League Baseball. He played for the Tigers (1969–1972), Oakland Athletics (1972), San Diego Padres (1972), and Cleveland Indians (1972–1973). Kilkenny is perhaps best known for giving up Frank Robinson's 499th home run on September 13, 1971, and also for being one of the few players in MLB history to play for four teams in the same season.

The majority of his 139 appearances were as a relief pitcher; he also started 54 games. During his career, Kilkenny gave up 224 walks in just 410 innings, for a BB/9IP of 4.92, much higher than the American League average at that time. With 301 strikeouts, his K/9IP was 6.61, which was higher than the American League average. He finished his career with a total of 23 wins, 18 losses, 4 saves, 32 games finished, and an ERA of 4.43.

On August 12, 1969, Kilkenny pitched a three-hit shutout against the California Angels for his first major league victory. Earlier the same day, Kilkenny's wife, Carol, gave birth to the couple's first child, Rory Erin Kilkenny.

In 1969, Kilkenny was named Tigers Rookie of the Year.

Kilkenny was traded with cash from the Tigers to the Athletics for Reggie Sanders on May 9, 1972.

After his professional career ended, Kilkenny played for the London Majors of the Canadian Intercounty Baseball League where he helped the Majors win the Intercounty title in 1975. He was voted MVP during the regular season, winning the John Bell Memorial trophy with a 9–0 record and 129 strikeouts.

References

 Intercounty Major Baseball League's 1998 Record Book by Editor Herb Morell and Dominico Productions Inc.

External links

1945 births
2018 deaths
Baseball people from Ontario
Canadian expatriate baseball players in the United States
Cleveland Indians players
Cocoa Rookie League Tigers players
Daytona Beach Islanders players
Detroit Tigers players
Florida Instructional League Tigers players
Canadian baseball players
Canadian sportspeople of Irish descent
Lakeland Tigers players
London Majors players
Major League Baseball pitchers
Major League Baseball players from Canada
Montgomery Rebels players
Oakland Athletics players
San Diego Padres players
Sportspeople from London, Ontario
Toledo Mud Hens players